Sydney Ford (born December 2, 1960), better known as Sydney Youngblood, is an American-German singer, actor and composer, who had several successful dance hits during the late 1980s and early 1990s.

Early life
Ford was born in Texas in December 1960. From an early age he loved singing. He won a competition aged six in his hometown where his grandmother called him ‘youngblood’ for his ‘vibrancy’ to perform. He played in a number of bands but at age twenty, he was drafted into the US army and served in Germany for five years. Ford returned home and returned to music straight away, only this time seeking fame and fortune as a solo artist. Signed to Virgin Records, his first release was a cover of Bill Withers' "Ain't No Sunshine", which made a short appearance in the lower section of the UK Singles Chart in 1988.

Career
Youngblood had two top 40 hits in the UK and Europe in 1988 and 1989, "Sit and Wait" and his debut "If Only I Could", which reached number three on the UK Singles Chart. The song uses the bassline and drumbeat from the Raze track "Break 4 Love".

In the US, the song "I'd Rather Go Blind" (originally sung by Etta James) enjoyed heavy rotation on the dance scene and made the top 10 on the Billboard Dance chart. "Sit and Wait" reached number 16 in the UK in December 1989.

Youngblood continued his success with the album Feeling Free, which also contained his earlier single, "Ain't No Sunshine".

In 2018, Youngblood participated in the 12th season of the German reality show I'm a Star – Get Me Out of Here! on RTL Television.

Discography

Studio albums

Compilation albums

Singles

See also
List of house music artists and releases

References

External links
Discogs Profile Page – Sydney Youngblood
Official Homepage – International

Living people
1960 births
African-American male singers
American house musicians
American emigrants to Germany
German male singers
German house musicians
Singers from Texas
Virgin Records artists
RCA Records artists
Arista Records artists
Ich bin ein Star – Holt mich hier raus! participants